Haworthiopsis woolleyi (synonym Haworthia woolleyi) is a succulent plant in the subfamily Asphodeloideae, found in the southern part of the Cape Provinces of South Africa (Steytlerville Division).

References

woolleyi
Flora of the Cape Provinces